Willcocks's honeyguide (Indicator willcocksi) is a species of bird in the family Indicatoridae.
It is found mainly throughout the African tropical rainforest.

The common name and Latin binomial commemorate the General Sir  James Willcocks.

References

Willcocks's honeyguide
Birds of the African tropical rainforest
Willcocks's honeyguide
Taxonomy articles created by Polbot